Anbar in Iran, may refer to:
 Anbar, Khuzestan (عنبر - ʿAnbar)
 Anbar, West Azerbaijan (انبار - Anbār)
 Anbar-e Maran, West Azerbaijan Province
 Anbar-e Olya, West Azerbaijan Province
 Anbar-e Olya, Bukan, West Azerbaijan Province
 Anbar-e Sofla, West Azerbaijan Province